Dann-Jaques Mouton is a South African film, television, and theatre actor.

Early life

Mouton was born in 1986 in Kraaifontein, Western Cape, South Africa. He matriculated at Eben Dönges High School. He obtained a Diploma in Theatre and Performance from UCT.

Theatre
His acting credits include:

 Die Kragbox (2011) 
 Ek Sien 'n Man (2011) 
 Antony and Cleopatra Maynardville (2011) 
 Die Vreemdeling (2010) 
 Autopsy (2010) 
 As You Like It Maynardville Voices Made Night (2009)

Television 

He played the role of Justin Booysen in the daily SABC2 program 7de Laan.

Films
He played in the following films:

 Noem my Skollie Call Me Thief (2016) 
 Thys & Trix (2018)
 Tess (2016)
 Abraham (2015)

Awards

SAFTA award for the best actor in Noem my Skollie Call Me Thief.

References

External links

Living people
South African male film actors
South African male stage actors
South African male soap opera actors
1986 births